The New York State Treasurer was a state cabinet officer in the State of New York between 1776 and 1926. During the re-organization of the state government under Governor Al Smith, the office was abolished and its responsibilities transferred to the new Department of Audit and Control headed to the New York State Comptroller.

History
In 1776, the New York Provincial Congress appointed Peter Van Brugh Livingston Treasurer to disburse the monies raised and issued in the revolutionary operations of the day.

After the establishment of the state government, the Treasurer was appointed by special act of the New York State Legislature for short periods.

Under the New York State Constitution of 1821, the Treasurer was elected by joint ballot of the State Legislature.

Under the Constitution of 1846, the office became elective by general election, and the Treasurer was elected with the other state cabinet officers in odd years to a two-year term, serving in the second year of the governor in office and the first year of the succeeding governor. The Treasurer was elected in 1895 to a three-year term, and subsequently was elected in even years and served a two-year term concurrently with the governor until the end of 1926.

New York State Treasurers

Notes

 
1776 establishments in New York (state)